Matseyevka is a rural locality (a selo) in Nechayevsky Selsoviet, Kizilyurtovsky District, Republic of Dagestan, Russia. The population was 460 as of 2010. There are 20 streets.

Geography 
Matseyevka is located 15 km northwest of Kizilyurt (the district's administrative centre) by road. Akhtini and Nechayevka are the nearest rural localities.

Nationalities 
Avars live there.

References 

Rural localities in Kizilyurtovsky District